Darren Morrissey (born 1999) is an Irish hurler who plays for Galway Senior Championship club Sarsfields and at inter-county level with the Galway senior hurling team. He usually lines out as a right corner-back.

Playing career

Sarsfields

Morrissey joined the Sarsfields club at a young age and played in all grades at juvenile and underage levels. He made his first appearance for the club's senior team during the 2017 Galway Championship.

Galway

Minor

Morrissey first played for Galway when he captained the minor team during the 2017 All-Ireland Championship. He made his first appearance for the team on 22 July 2017 in a 2-19 to 1-12 defeat of Clare. On 3 September, Morrissey captained Galway to a 2-17 to 2-15 All-Ireland final defeat of Cork at Croke Park.

Senior

Morrissey made his senior debut for Galway on 3 February 2019 when he played at right corner-back in a 0-20 apiece draw with Carlow in the National Hurling League.

Honours

Galway
National Hurling League (1): 2021
All-Ireland Minor Hurling Championship (1): 2017 (c)

Career statistics

References

1999 births
Living people
Sarsfields (Galway) hurlers
Galway inter-county hurlers